Bolinas, California is an unincorporated community in Marin County, California with a reputation as an art colony. This list includes any notable people known to have resided in Bolinas.

Donald Allen, editor, publisher
Dawn-Michelle Baude, poet
Bill Berkson, poet
Ted Berrigan, poet
Peg Bracken, author
Joe Brainard, artist and writer
Richard Brautigan, writer
Gail Carriger, writer
Jim Carroll, author, poet, rock musician
C. West Churchman, philosopher
Suzanne Ciani, electronic music pioneer
Tom Clark, poet, biographer
Joel Coen, one of the Coen Brothers, screenwriter, film director
Signy Coleman, actress
Clark Coolidge, poet
Robert Creeley, poet, author
Stephen Emerson, author
Paulette Frankl, artist, photographer, biographer
Robert Grenier, poet
Paul Harris, sculptor and lithographer
Bobbie Louise Hawkins, poet
Stephan Jenkins, singer, songwriter, Third Eye Blind frontman
Paul Kantner, rhythm guitarist, rock vocalist, songwriter
Harmony Korine, film director, producer, screenwriter
Joanne Kyger, poet with ties to the Beat generation
Anne Lamott, nonfiction author
Kenneth Lamott, writer
Annie Leibovitz, photographer
Mary Tuthill Lindheim, sculptor and studio potter
Lewis MacAdams, poet, author
Jerry Mander, activist, author
Paul McCandless, master oboist, reed player, co-founded Oregon, world class musician
Frances McDormand, actress
Barry McGee, artist
 Duncan McNaughton, poet
David Meltzer, poet
Walter Murch, Academy Award-winning film editor, sound mixer
Bill Niman, founder with Orville Schell of Niman Ranch Meats
Alice Notley, poet
Arthur Okamura, painter and silk screen artist
Guy Overfelt, conceptual artist
Gladys Kathleen Parkin, wireless radio operator
Ponponio Lupugeyun, Coast Miwok, born c. 1799 to the Guaulen local tribe area of present-day Bolinas; insurgent
Bill Rafferty, television personality
Stephen Ratcliffe, poet
Charles A. Reich, professor of law at Yale University, author
Aram Saroyan, poet, novelist, playwright
Strawberry Saroyan, journalist and author
Orville Schell, dean of the UC Berkeley Graduate School of Journalism
Tony Serra, radical civil rights attorney, tax resister
Grace Slick, rock singer, songwriter
Sean Thackrey, winemaker
Susie Tompkins Buell, founder of Esprit
Lewis Warsh, writer and artist
Peter Warshall, ecologist, member of the board of directors of the Bolinas Community Public Utility District
Philip Whalen, poet
Michael Wolfe, poet, author, publisher, documentary film producer

References

People from Bolinas
 
Bolinas
Bolinas, California